Al-Tabni (also spelled al-Tibni) is a town in eastern Syria, administratively part of the Deir ez-Zor Governorate, located along the Euphrates River, west of Deir ez-Zor. According to the Syria Central Bureau of Statistics,  al-Tabni had a population of 7,205 in the 2004 census.

References

Populated places in Deir ez-Zor District
Populated places on the Euphrates River
Towns in Syria